Nixon Waterman (12 November 1859, in Newark, Kendall County, Illinois – 1 September 1944, in Canton, Norfolk County, Massachusetts) was a newspaper writer, poet and Chautauqua lecturer, who rose to prominence in the 1890s.

References

External links

 
 
 

1859 births
1944 deaths
American male journalists
People from Kendall County, Illinois
American male poets
Journalists from Illinois